Barghoun, is a village in Koura District of Lebanon. In the north of the village there lies the remains of a 12th-14th-century church dedicated to Saint Barbara.

References

Populated places in the North Governorate
Koura District
Sunni Muslim communities in Lebanon